Hendrik Franciscus Andriessen (17 September 1892 – 12 April 1981) was a Dutch composer and organist. He is remembered most of all for his improvisation at the organ and for the renewal of Catholic liturgical music in the Netherlands. Andriessen composed in a musical idiom that revealed strong French influences. He was the brother of pianist and composer Willem Andriessen and the father of the composers Jurriaan Andriessen and Louis Andriessen and of the flautist Heleen Andriessen.

Life and career
Andriessen was born in Haarlem, the son of Gezina Johanna (Vester), a painter, and Nicolaas Hendrik Andriessen, a church organist. As the organist at St. Catherine's Cathedral, Utrecht, he became well known for his improvisation abilities. From 1926 to 1954, he lectured in composition and music theory at the Amsterdam Conservatory while also teaching at the Institute for Catholic Church Music in Utrecht between 1930 and 1949. He was the director of the Utrecht Conservatory from 1937 to 1949.

During World War II, Andriessen refused to join the "Cultural House" (Kultuurkamer) and was thus barred from public functions by the Nazi occupiers. The only musical activities he was allowed were to give lessons and to accompany church services. He was held hostage by German occupiers from 13 July until 18 December 1942, when he was released.

In 1949, he was appointed director of the Royal Conservatory in The Hague, a post he held until 1957. Between 1954 and 1962, he was appointed an Extraordinary Professor of Musicology at the Catholic University of Nijmegen.

Andriessen's works included, besides eight masses, a setting of the Te Deum, four symphonies, variations for orchestra, lieder for voice and orchestra, chamber music, sonatas for cello and for piano, and works for solo organ. He died in Haarlem.

Selected works

Orchestra
 Symphony No. 1 (1930)
 Variations and Fugue on a Theme of Johann Kuhnau, for string orchestra (1935)
 Symphony No. 2 (1937)
 Variations on a Theme by Couperin for solo flute, string orchestra, and harp (1944)
 Symphony No. 3 (1946)
 Ricercare (1949) (also arranged for wind orchestra, 1977)
 Wilhelmus Rhapsody (1950)
 Concerto for Organ and Orchestra (1950)
 Symphonic Etude (1952)
 Libertas venit – Rhapsody (1954)
 Symphony No. 4 (1954)
 Symphonie Concertante for Violin, Viola & Orchestra (1962)
 Mascherata (1962)
 Violin Concerto (1969)
 Cello Concertino (1970)
 Oboe Concertino (1970)
 Chromatic Variations (1970)
 Canzone for Cello & Strings (1971)
 Chantecler Overture (1972)
 Hymnus in Pentecostem (1976)

Wind orchestra
Ricercare (1977) (rev. from 1949 orchestral work)

Chamber
 1914 Sonata, for violin and piano (lost)
 1924 Sonatina, for viola and piano
 1926 Sonata, for cello and piano = Sonate pour violoncelle et piano [a Thomas Canivez]
 1932 Sonata No. 2 for violin and piano
 1937 Drie Inventionen for violin & cello
 1938 Sérénade, for flute/violin, violin/oboe en cello/bassoon
 1939 Piano Trio
 1950 Intermezzo for flute & harp
 1950 Suite for violin and piano I. Preludio, II. Fuguetta, III. Air Varié, IV. Finale
 1951 Quintet, for Woodwind Quintet
 1952 Ballade for oboe & piano
 1957 Quartetto in stile antico for String Quartet
 1961 Il pensiero for string quartet
 1967 Tre Pezzi, for flute and harp
 1967 Sonata for viola & piano
 1969 L'Indifferent, for String Quartet
 1970 Serenade for flute, horn, and piano
 1972 Divertimento a cinque, for flute, oboe, violin, viola and cello
 1973 Choral Varié, for 3 trumpets and 3 trombones

Organ
 Aria (1944)
 Chorals (Premier: 1913), (Deuxième: 1916, rev. 1965), (Troisième: 1920), (Quatrième: 1921, rev. 1951)
 Toccata (1917)
 Fête-Dieu (1918)
 Fuga a 5 voici c kl. terts (1916)
 Sonata 'Da Pacem, Domine' (1913), Previously lost, the manuscript was found in 2021 by American organist Gregory D'Agostino and Dutch historian Jort Fokkens.
 Sonata da chiesa (1927)
 Passacaglia (1929)
 Theme with Variations (1949)
 In dulci jubilo (1961)
 Interlude (1957)
 Interludium (1968)
 Intermezzi: 24 pieces in two books (1935 and 1943–46)
 Intermezzo (1950)
 Meditation on the Hymn "O Lord with Wondrous Mystery" (1960)
 O filii et filiae (1961)
 O sacred head (1962)
 Offertorium (1962)
 Prelude and Fugue in D minor
 Preghiera (1962)
 Quattro studi per organo (1953)
 Sinfonia (1939)
 Suite (1968)
 Veni Creator Spiritus (1961)

Piano
Sonata (1934)
Pavane (1937)
Passepied (1942)
Menuet (1944)
Sérénade (1950)

Opera
Philomela (1948–1949), in 3 acts; libretto by Jan Engelman
De Spiegel uit Venetië (The Mirror from Venice; Der Spiegel von Venedig) (1963–1964), chamber opera in 1 act; libretto by

Oratorio
L'histoire de l'enfant de Dieu, libretto by Pierre Kemp, for soprano, tenor, choir and orchestra (1920)

Choir
Sonnet de Pierre Ronsard (1917)
Missa in honorem Sacratissimi Cordis, with organ (1919)
Missa in festo assumptionis with organ (1925)
Missa sponsa Christi with organ (1928)
Missa Simplex, a cappella (1928)
De veertien stonden with organ & strings (1928)
Missa diatonica (1935)
Magnificat, with organ (1936)
Missa Christus Rex (1938)
Te Deum, with organ (1943)
Laudes vespertinae with organ (1944)
Missa solemnis, with organ (1946)
Ommagio a Marenzio (1965)
Te Deum, with orchestra (1968)

Lieder
Magna res est amor, with organ (1919, orchestrated 1919)
Fiat domine, with organ (1920, orchestrated 1930)
Miroir de peine (set of five songs on texts by French poet Henri Ghéon, 1875–1944) (1923, orchestrated 1933)
Trois pastorales (1935)

Books and other writings
César Franck (1941)
Over muziek (1950)
Muziek en muzikaliteit (1952)

References

Sources

Further reading
Schell, Mark David. 1995. "A Performer's Guide to Representative Solo Organ Works of Hendrik Andriessen". D.M.A. diss. Louisville: The Southern Baptist Theological Seminary.

External links
 
 

1892 births
1981 deaths
20th-century classical composers
20th-century Dutch composers
Royal Conservatory of The Hague alumni
Cathedral organists
Classical composers of church music
Dutch classical organists
Male classical organists
Dutch male classical composers
Dutch classical composers
Dutch music educators
Organ improvisers
People from Haarlem
20th-century organists
20th-century Dutch male musicians